Fabian Kwok (born 17 March 1989) is a Singaporean professional footballer who plays as a central-midfielder, defensive-midfielder or centre-back for Singapore Premier League Club Balestier Khalsa FC and the Singapore National Team. He is considered a club legend for Hougang United making over 100 appearances for the club.

Career
Fabian Kwok played in the S.League for Tampines Rovers, Geylang International, Young Lions FC and currently Hougang United. The highlight of his career came when he scored long ranged goal for the Eagles from the halfway line.

Career statistics 
As of 10 Oct 2021

References

External links

1989 births
Living people
Singaporean footballers
Singaporean sportspeople of Chinese descent
Association football midfielders
Tampines Rovers FC players
Geylang International FC players
Balestier Khalsa FC players
Hougang United FC players
Singapore Premier League players